Massilia albidiflava is a Gram-negative, rod-shaped, oxidase and catalase positive, non-spore-forming motile bacterium from the genus Massilia and the family Oxalobacteraceae which was isolated with Massilia dura, Massilia plicata, and Massilia lutea from soil samples in southeast China.

References

External links
Type strain of Massilia albidiflava at BacDive -  the Bacterial Diversity Metadatabase

Burkholderiales
Bacteria described in 2006